Sebastian Pietro Innocenzo Adhemar Ziani de Ferranti (9 April 1864 – 13 January 1930) was a British electrical engineer and inventor.

Personal life
Sebastian Ziani de Ferranti was born in Liverpool, England.  His Italian father, Cesare, was a photographer (son of composer Marco Aurelio Zani de Ferranti) and his mother Juliana de Ferranti (née Scott) was a concert pianist.  He was educated at Hampstead School, London; St. Augustine's College, Westgate-on-Sea; and University College London.

He married Gertrude Ruth Ince on 24 April 1888 and they had seven children together. Ferranti died on 13 January 1930 in Zurich, Switzerland. He was buried in the same grave as his parents and his daughter Yolanda at Hampstead Cemetery, London.

His grandson, Basil de Ferranti, was a Conservative politician who represented Morecambe and Lonsdale in the late fifties and early sixties. His granddaughter Valerie Hunter Gordon invented what is considered the world's first disposable nappy and an early sanitary towel system.

Professional career

Ferranti showed a remarkable talent for electrical engineering from his childhood. His first invention, at the age of 13, was an arc light for street lighting. Reportedly, around the age of 16, he built an electrical generator (that had a "Zig-zag armature") with the help of William Thomson (the future Lord Kelvin) and later patented the device (called the "Ferranti Dynamo"). He worked for Siemens Brothers at Charlton, London, and in 1882 he set up shop in London designing various electrical devices as the firm Ferranti, Thompson and Ince.

In the late 1880s, there was a debate within the American industry about the transmission of electrical power, known as the war of the currents. Thomas Edison supported a direct current (DC) based system, largely due to his holding many key patents and having set up some power plants supplying DC power. The rival Westinghouse Electric Corporation supported an alternating current (AC) system.

Ferranti bet on AC early on, and was one of the few experts in this system in the UK. In 1887, the London Electric Supply Corporation (LESCo) hired Ferranti for the design of their power station at Deptford. He designed the building, the generating plant and the distribution system. On its completion in 1891, it was the first truly modern power station, supplying high-voltage AC power for distribution at 11kV that was then "stepped down" for consumer use on each street. This basic system remains in use today around the world. One of the remaining supports of the generating hall of Deptford Power Station forms the frame of the sign at the Museum of Science and Industry in Manchester UK, home of the Ferranti Archives.

S. Z. de Ferranti, the company set up by Ferranti in 1885 with Francis Ince and Charles Sparks as partners, became S. Z de Ferranti Ltd in 1890 and Ferranti Ltd in 1900, after resignation of Ince and Sparks. Ferranti Ltd would outlive its founder and develop the Ferranti Mark 1, the world's first commercially available general-purpose computer, in 1951.

Sebastian de Ferranti was President of the Institution of Electrical Engineers in 1910 and 1911, and was elected a Fellow of the Royal Society in 1927. He received an honorary doctorate from the University of Manchester in 1912. Ferranti was actively involved in the formation of the British Electrical and Allied Manufacturers Association (BEAMA) in 1911 and its first chairman, to 1913.

In 1932, the London Power Company commemorated Sebastian de Ferranti by naming a new 1,315 GRT coastal collier SS Ferranti.

Patents
 " Unipolar dynamo electric machine".

See also
 Vincent Ziani de Ferranti (son)
 Basil de Ferranti (grandson)
 Valerie Hunter Gordon (granddaughter)
 Ferranti effect
 Baslow Hall

References

Further reading
 The Life and Letters of Sebastian Ziani de Ferranti by Gertrude Ziani de Ferranti and Richard Ince; published 1934 by Williams & Norgate, Ltd.
 Centenary of Sebastian Ziani de Ferranti, D.Sc.,F.R.S., born 9 April 1864: Founder of Ferranti, Ltd.,1882; published 1964 by Ferranti.

External links

Institution of Engineering and Technology
 

Ferranti, Sebastian Ziani de
Ferranti, Sebastian Ziani de
Alumni of University College London
Burials at Hampstead Cemetery
Ferranti, Sebastian Ziani de
Ferranti, Sebastian Ziani de
Ferranti, Sebastian
Ferranti, Sebastian
Ferranti
Ferranti, Sebastian